U-156 may refer to one of the following German submarines:

 , a Type U 151 submarine launched in 1917; served in World War I until sunk on 25 September 1918
 , a Type IXC submarine that served in World War II until sunk on 8 March 1943

Submarines of Germany